Pooran Kiri is an Indian film and television actor best known for his role as Suresh Aggarwal in the 2014 Star Plus television Series Yeh Rishta Kya Kehlata Hai.

Professional career
Kiri started his career as a video editor and worked on a news channel as video editor, he also worked with a news channel in Chhattisgarh. Kiri also participated in more than 200 street plays, Kiri also performed at many stage shows as a mimicry artist and also hosted many shows. In 2002 Kiri joined a theater group IIFTA, Chhattisgarh Madhya Pradesh. Kiri got his first chance in 2011 in daily soap Mann Kee Awaaz Pratigya on STAR Plus.

Television

Filmography

References

Indian male television actors
Male actors from Chhattisgarh
Living people
Year of birth missing (living people)